Hollister Elementary School District is a public school district based in San Benito County, California, United States.

References

External links

School districts in California